Iurreta is a town and municipality located in the province of Biscay, in the autonomous community of Basque Autonomous Community, northern Spain. Incorporated into the municipality of Durango in 1926, Iurreta regained its independent status in 1990. The traditional anteiglesia or town meeting system of local government was revived.

External links
 IURRETA in the Bernardo Estornés Lasa - Auñamendi Encyclopedia (Euskomedia Fundazioa)

References

Municipalities in Biscay